Clutch is a Canadian crime/thriller web series created by Jonathan Robbins.  It premiered on Vimeo in May 2011, but has since found a home on other broadcast sites such as Koldcast TV, Blip and JTS.TV.  The webisodes are also available via DVD and special, purchasable USB keys.

The show follows the exploits of Kylie (Elitsa Bako), a pickpocket, forced to go on the run from a crime syndicate run by Marcel Obertovitch (Peter Hodgins), after her boyfriend, Matt (Matthew Carvery), betrays him.  She teams up with a prostitute named Bridget (Lea Lawrynowicz) and fellow pickpocket Mike (Jeff Sinasac) to go on the offensive and rob Marcel.

As of the summer of 2013, two seasons have been released.

History
Clutch was inspired by the short film Your Ex-Lover Is Dead, previously written and produced by Jonathan Robbins.  Shooting began in November 2010.

Format
Those episodes which require it begin with a warning that "This Episode of Clutch contains scenes with Violence, Nudity and Coarse Language.  Viewer Discretion is advised."

In Season One, each episode concludes with the voice-over, "Next time on Clutch," followed by a brief teaser of upcoming events and closes with the song "Seven Day Mile" sung by Glen Hansard.

Season Two dispenses with the teaser for the upcoming episode and closes with the song "Down" by Esza Kaye.

Plot

Season 1 (2011)
Kylie returns home from a night of pocket picking to find two goons, including Hatchet Man (Buzz Koffman), threatening to cut off the hand of her boyfriend, Matt.  Matt had gotten involved with a courier job for crime boss Marcel, and had failed to deliver the $50,000 he was supposed to.  Offering herself in sexual trade, Kylie distracts then dispatches the goons, then goes on the run.

She takes up residency in a seedy motel where she befriends the prostitute, Bridget.  She then recommences her pocket picking lifestyle, unaware that her actions are being observed by fellow pickpocket, Mike.

Mike corners Kylie in an alley and draws her attention to the fact that both police and local crime organizations have noted her stepped up pocket picking activities.  He offers her an alternative with a much bigger heist, suggesting she pose as Marcel's personal dominatrix, Raven (Alexandra Elle), and once he's tied up, abscond with the briefcase of cash he carries with him.

Together with Bridget, Mike and Kylie infiltrate the fetish dungeon Marcel frequents, where Kylie assumes the role of Raven.  The heist does not go off as planned, though, when several of Marcel's armed guards realize something is amiss, and Hatchet Man and Matt, who have been trailing Kylie, catch up to her.  After a bloody shootout, Mike, Kylie and Bridget flee in Hatchet Man's Ferrari, leaving Matt to fend for himself.

Season 2 (2012-2013)
In the aftermath of the disastrous robbery of Season 1, everyone's gone their separate ways.  Kylie is in hiding, Mike has returned to his pocket picking lifestyle, and Matt has actually been recruited by Marcel and become secretly entangled with Marcel's daughter, Lex (Caitlynne Medrek).  Raven's dungeon has been shut down, and she's been forced into becoming Marcel's personal dominatrix, while her former employees have been forced into prostitution.

Marcel abducts Bridget and forces her into revealing Kylie's location.  Bridget is then forced into the prostitution ring, as well.

Matt reconnects with Mike when he and Lex are sent to collect on a debt Mike owes, during which time, Matt fakes Mike's death.

In Marcel's cathouse, Bridget and fellow sex-slave, Jordan (Katherine Fogler), begin a relationship.  But tormented by the guilt of having given up Kylie, Bridget takes her own life, spurring Jordan to seek to kill Marcel.  She corners Raven, mistakenly believing she is a willing accomplice of Marcel's, but the two hatch a plan to join forces to take down Marcel together.

Their quest leads them to Mike, who has connections in the arms trafficking world.  Learning of Bridget's death, and feeling no end of guilt for involving everyone in the failed robbery that started all this, he reluctantly agrees to find them weapons.

Raven learns where Kylie has been taken, and uses this to leverage Matt into joining their cause.  Matt then plays off this guilt to get Mike to commit more than mere weapons.

Marcel gathers many of the girls for a sale, whereupon the girls retrieve their hidden weapons and unleash hell on the sex traffickers.  Marcel escapes, and Lex is driven off by Michelle (Emily Schooley).

Matt and Mike steal aboard an escaping van and end up at the holding house where Kylie was last known to be.  Posing as buyers, they infiltrate the house.  Unknown to them, Agent Kriss (Katya Gardner) of the FBI has already allowed herself to be captured, and has a plan in place with her partner to take down the trafficking ring.  A young girl named Nicole (Jillian Clare) has also recently been captured.

Darius (Tom Konkle), the boss of the trafficking ring, believes Matt and Mike to be FBI agents and shoots Agent Kriss, whereupon her partner begins an assault from the outside.  Together with Nicole, Matt and Mike manage to escape, but not before Agent Kriss reveals that Kylie had in fact been there.

Main cast
Kylie is fearless and aggressive, but with a soft spot for those she sees as victimized.  She is a self-taught pickpocket and, at the start of the series, is dating Matt, who she intends to marry.  Kylie is portrayed by Elitsa Bako.
Matt is the opposite of Kylie, cowardly and conniving.  He begins the series working as a courier for Marcel, though he betrays his boss and steals $50,000, which is what starts all the trouble for Kylie in the first place.  He later offers to sell Kylie into sexual slavery to save his own life.  Matt is played by Matthew Carvery.
Marcel Obertovitch is the local crime lord.  He is a creature of extreme habit, and particular fetishes, visiting the same dominatrix after every business deal, and taking her out to dinner every Tuesday.  He is vicious, ruthless, and casual about killing.  Marcel is portrayed by Peter Hodgins.
Hatchet Man, sometimes called Hatch, is Marcel's right-hand man.  His right eye was put out by Marcel and he serves his boss with a growing resentment.  His preferred method of killing is with hatchets, hence his name.  He is also a talented painter.  Hatchet Man is played by Buzz Koffman.
Bridget is the prostitute who occupies the hotel room next to Kylie's.  The two meet and become friends when Kylie intervenes to bring justice to a john attempting to stiff Bridget on fees for her services.  Bridget is brave and resourceful, as she proves when she aids Mike and Kylie on their big heist.  Bridget is portrayed by Lea Lawrynowicz.
Mike is an extremely skilled pickpocket, though he prefers the label "thief".  He is quick-witted and courageous.  He sets up the big heist when he recognizes Kylie's resemblance to Marcel's dominatrix, though he's more than a little worried when he discovers Kylie's previous connection to Marcel.  Mike is played by Jeff Sinasac.
Raven is Marcel's dominatrix and owner of the fetish dungeon Marcel frequents.  She oozes sexuality but is a consummate professional who becomes all business when she perceives a threat to her establishment.  Raven is played by Alexandra Elle.
Michelle (aka The Fetish Guide) is the face of Raven's fetish dungeon.  Usually cool and collected, she can become flustered when the unexpected comes into play. She is tough, and strikes out on her own at the end of Season Two. Michelle is played by Emily Schooley.
Lex, first appearing in Season 2, is Marcel's daughter.  She is twisted and sadistic, and intensely jealous of her father's affections for Raven.  Lex is played by Caitlynne Medrek.
Jordan, introduced in Season 2, is one of the forced prostitutes in Marcel's cathouse.  She falls in love with Bridget, and swears vengeance on Marcel after Bridget's death.  She is played by Katherine Fogler.

Other Characters
The Bodyguard is Marcel's immediate protection, left to guard the entrance while Marcel is otherwise occupied with Raven.  The Bodyguard takes his job seriously but is easily seduced by a pretty girl.  The Bodyguard is portrayed by Rick Gomes.
Danielle is an air-headed high school friend of Kylie's with no clue about Kylie's criminal leanings.  Danielle is played by Sarah Strong.
Emily is one of Marcel's enslaved prostitutes.  Her near rape is instrumental Raven's decision to lead an insurrection against Marcel.  Emily is played by Janelle Hanna, and is rumoured to have been named after Emily Schooley.
Andrew is one of Marcel's henchman, who meets a bad end after being betrayed by Lex.  Andrew is played by Neil J. Bennett.
The Hookers with a Vengeance are the prostitutes Raven ropes into her plan.  They eventually take up arms against Marcel.
Agatha runs the cathouse on Marcel's behalf.  She does her job willingly and without care for the welfare of her girls.  Agatha is portrayed by Wendy Glazier.
The Landlord is a perpetual thorn in Mike's side, constantly threatening to evict him when he's behind on the rent.  He is played by Afroz Khan.
Agent Kriss is an FBI agent who infiltrates a sex trafficking ring to try to learn more about it.  She is killed by Darius after Mike and Matt arrive.  Agent Kriss is played by Katya Gardner.
Darius runs a sex trafficking ring somewhere in the southern U.S.  Genteel and soft-spoken, he is nonetheless capable of murder, as he proves with Agent Kriss.  He is played by Tom Konkle.
Nicole is a young girl who falls into Darius' clutches.  She manages to escape and even bravely steals a car from one of the guards, which she uses to rescue Matt and Mike.  She is played by Jillian Clare.
The Trafficker is Darius' right-hand man.  He admits Matt and Mike into the trafficking house, believing them to be federal agents.  He is played by Darrell Dennis.

Awards

Nominated
2011 Indie Intertube Awards - Best Cinematography
2011 Indie Intertube Awards - Best Action Series
2011 Digital Launch Pad - Finalist
2012 Marseilles Webfest - Official Selection
2012 International Television Festival - Best Drama
2013 3rd Annual Streamy Awards - Best Sci-fi/Action Series
2013 4th Annual Indie Soap Awards - Best Guest Appearance
2013 Canadian Cinema Editors Award - Best Editing in a Live Action Web Series
2013 Raindance Film Festival - Official Selection
2013 Hollyweb Festival - Official Selection
2014 IAWTV Awards - Best Original Score
2014 IAWTV Awards - Best Ensemble Cast
2014 Indie Series Awards - Best Composer
2014 Indie Series Awards - Best Visual Effects
2014 Hollyweb Festival - Official Selection

Won
Grand Jury Prize - 2012 L.A. Webfest
Outstanding Cinematography in a Dramatic Series - 2012 L.A. Webfest
Outstanding Directing in a Dramatic Series - 2012 L.A. Webfest
Outstanding Dramatic Series - 2012 L.A. Webfest
Outstanding Editing in a Dramatic Series - 2012 L.A. Webfest
Outstanding Lead Actress in a Dramatic Series - 2012 L.A. Webfest
Outstanding Visual Effects in a Dramatic Series - 2012 L.A. Webfest
Outstanding Writing in a Dramatic Series - 2012 L.A. Webfest
Honoree - 16th Annual Webby Awards
Award of Distinction in Video - 18th Annual Communicator Awards
Award of Merit for Episode 8 - 2012 Best Shorts Competition
Award of Merit for Leading Actress - 2012 Indiefest
Award of Excellence - 2012 Indiefest
Silver Award for Drama Series - 2012 W3 Awards
Silver Award for Writing - 2012 W3 Awards
Best International Series - 2013 IFQ Festival
Outstanding Directing in a Dramatic Series - 2013 L.A. Webfest
Outstanding Writing in a Dramatic Series - 2013 L.A. Webfest
Award of Excellence for Movie or Television Website - 19th Annual Communicator Awards
Best Suspense/Thriller - 2013 Atlanta Webfest
Best Television or Web Series - 2013 Pollygrind Film Festival
Outstanding Actor in a Dramatic Series - 2014 L.A. Webfest
Outstanding Composer in a Dramatic Series - 2014 L.A. Webfest
Outstanding Writing in a Dramatic Series - 2014 L.A. Webfest
Best Director (Drama) - 2014 Indie Series Awards
Best Supporting Actress (Drama) - 2014 Indie Series Awards
Gold Award for Drama Series - 2014 Communicator Awards
Best Action/Adventure Series - 2014 Miami Webfest

References

External links

Clutch the Series ad-free on JTS.TV
Clutch the Series on Blip

2011 web series debuts
Canadian drama web series
Action adventure web series
Crime thriller web series
2010s Canadian crime television series